Disney Channel Hits: Take 1 is a CD and DVD collection of songs and music videos from Disney Channel Original Series. Released on October 26, 2004, the CD includes songs from Lizzie McGuire, That's So Raven, Even Stevens, Kim Possible and The Proud Family, plus six never-before released tracks. The DVD includes five music videos of select songs from the CD. A second compilation focusing on songs from Disney Channel Original Movies was released the following year.

Track listing 
 "Lizzie McGuire Theme Song" (Extended Supa Mix) 
 "I Can't Wait" - Hilary Duff (from Lizzie McGuire)
 "That's So Raven Theme Song" - Raven
 "Supernatural" (Crystal Ball Mix) - Raven (from That's So Raven) 
 "Shine" - Raven (from That's So Raven)
 "Say the Word" - Christy Carlson Romano (from Kim Possible) 
 "It's Just You" - LMNT (from Kim Possible)
 "The Naked Mole Rap" - Ron Stoppable and Rufus  (from Kim Possible)
 "The Proud Family Theme Song" - Solange and Destiny's Child   
 "Enjoy Yourself" - L.P.D.Z. (from The Proud Family) 
 "It's All About Me" - Penny Proud (from The Proud Family)  
 "Even Stevens Theme Song"  
 "Aloha, E Komo Mai" (Theme Song - Extended Version) - Jump5 (from Lilo & Stitch: The Series) 
 "Phil of the Future Theme Song"   
 "Dave the Barbarian Theme Song"

Bonus music videos 
 "I Can't Wait" (from Lizzie McGuire) - Hilary Duff
 "Enjoy Yourself" (from The Proud Family) - L.P.D.Z.  
 "That's So Raven Theme Song" - Raven 
 "Supernatural" (from That's So Raven) - Raven  
 "The Naked Mole Rap" (from Kim Possible) - Ron Stoppable and Rufus

References 

Walt Disney Records compilation albums
Disney Channel albums
Television soundtracks
2004 compilation albums
2004 video albums
Music video compilation albums